Koedijk is a village in the Netherlands, in the province of North Holland. It is now a part of Alkmaar and of Dijk en Waard, but before 1972 those two parts were a separate municipality first mentioned in the 14th century. Koedijk is most famous for its annual Gondelvaart (gondola parade). This gondelvaart is held every year on the 3rd Saturday in August.

The name Koedijk means cow dyke. The Coedijc was the dike that protected the village of Vronen from the waters of the Rekere (or Recker), a tidal stream that ran about where the Noordhollandsch Kanaal is now located.

The village of Vronen was completely abandoned in 1297. The population was displaced when the village was destroyed after the battle between West Friesland and Holland, and relocated to the Coedijc. The old area of Vronen belonged to the new parish of Koedijk from then on.

Koedijk is, the location of two of the five operational vlotbruggen ("float bridges"): Koedijkervlotbrug and Rekervlotbrug.

Notable people
 Johannes Megapolensis (1603–1670), missionary to the Mohawk people in New Netherland
 Jan Buiskool (1899–1960), lawyer and Prime Minister of Suriname

Gallery

References

External links

Populated places in North Holland
Former municipalities of North Holland
Geography of Dijk en Waard
Alkmaar